Burnley Manchester Road is the main railway station in Burnley, Lancashire, England.

History
On 12 November 1849, the Manchester and Leeds Railway opened a single line branch – doubled in 1860 – from Todmorden to Burnley. The first station in the town, which was at Thorneybank, was replaced by Burnley Manchester Road in 1866. It had two stone platforms, a modest single-storey main building on the eastbound ("up") side and a smaller waiting room with toilets on the opposite side.

This closed to passenger traffic on 6 November 1961, and to goods in April 1973.  The platforms were subsequently demolished, but the main building was retained and used as industrial premises.  

The station was reopened (with new timber platforms) in September 1986, two years after the successful re-introduction of year-round services between Leeds and Preston/Blackpool North.  The old station building was eventually demolished in 2013.

Services

On weekdays, the station is served by Northern semi-fast services from Blackpool North or Preston to Leeds and York via the Caldervale Line.  Currently (December 2018) there is an hourly service in each direction each weekday.  On Sundays there is now also an hourly service (from mid-morning onwards) each since the May 2009 timetable change.

From 17 May 2015 an hourly service between Blackburn and Manchester Victoria serves the station seven days a week.

2013 Engineering work

Eastbound services (i.e. toward Hebden Bridge) were suspended for 5 months from November 2013 until the end of March 2014 whilst Network Rail carried out major repairs to Holme Tunnel (near to the site of the old Holme station).  The 265-yard (250 m) long structure had been subject to a permanent 20 mph speed restriction for many years due to earth movement in the surrounding ground that had damaged the tunnel lining and eastern portal (steel supports were installed for most of the way along the tunnel bore since the mid-1980s to prevent further deterioration).  The 20-week-long blockade has seen the tunnel lining strengthened & re-profiled, the damaged lining sections replaced, the eastern portal rebuilt, new track laid and drainage improvements carried out.  Since completion, trains can pass through the tunnel at 45 mph (72 kmh).  Replacement buses operated to and from Hebden Bridge, connecting with the train services from Blackpool and Preston whilst the work was in progress.  The line was reopened to traffic as scheduled on 24 March 2014.

Developments
Local councils and MP had campaigned to restore a direct rail link between the town and Manchester Victoria using the defunct south to west curve at Todmorden which was removed following the withdrawal of local trains in November 1965.  This would allow trains to run between Burnley and Manchester via Rochdale in less than an hour. Network Rail had intimated in its Lancashire & Cumbria RUS that such a link would be possible, but that the business case would only be viable with third party funding.  It was thought that the scheme would proceed following the finalising of a Multi Area funding agreement between central government and a consortium of councils in East Lancashire in January 2009, although it was subsequently omitted from the list of projects recommended for funding over the next decade by the North West Regional Development Agency in July 2009.

On 31 October 2011, it was announced that the scheme had been granted finance as part of the Regional Growth Fund announced by Deputy Prime Minister Nick Clegg.  Services were initially due to start at the May 2014 timetable change following completion of the curve (and its signalling) and the Holme Tunnel work. All structural work was completed by spring 2014. However, due to a lack of available rolling stock and unfinished signalling changes at the Todmorden end (which were not completed until February 2015) it was announced that services would not start until May 2015 at the earliest (eventually doing so at the May timetable change).

The plans have also seen the station facilities upgraded at a cost of £2.3 million with the opening of a new ticket office in a new station building and the provision of additional car parking spaces and new waiting shelters; completion was scheduled for Spring 2014. The station building opened in November 2014, having been almost complete and awaiting improvements to lighting since July.

The new ticket office is staffed throughout the week, from start of service until 21:45 on weekdays and Saturdays and until 17:00 on Sundays.  A self-service ticket machine is also available on the concourse.  Train running information is offered via digital display screens, automatic announcements and timetable posters.  Step-free access to both platforms is available via ramps from Manchester Road.

Notes

External links

Railway stations in Burnley
DfT Category F1 stations
Former Lancashire and Yorkshire Railway stations
Railway stations in Great Britain opened in 1866
Railway stations in Great Britain closed in 1961
Railway stations in Great Britain opened in 1986
Reopened railway stations in Great Britain
Northern franchise railway stations
1866 establishments in England